Chitwan Medical College Teaching Hospital, in Bharatpur, Nepal is affiliated to Tribhuvan University and is a first ISO certified Medical College.  This private medical college in Bharatpur is a 750-bed teaching hospital. All kinds of facilities are available for the treatment of patients. Recently, cancer care centre is also established in this college. This institution is headed by Dr. Harish Chandra Neupane. Several fields of bachelor studies such as in medicine, dentistry, public health are taught here.

References

External links
 

Medical colleges in Nepal
Hospitals in Nepal
Buildings and structures in Bharatpur, Nepal